Consolidated Consultants Group (CCG) is an international architectural and engineering consultancy firm, specialized in the provision of studies, planning, design and management services in architecture, buildings, infrastructure, transportation, roads, bridges, water and waste water, dams, hydrological analysis and hydraulic structures, with over 600 staff operating in more than 25 countries.

History
The firm has been operating in the field of engineering services since the 1960s. The company was restructured in 1993 by consolidating some of the major Jordanian consultancy firms and a number of outstanding individuals. The firm acquired the prestigious architecture consulting firm "Jafar Tukan and Partners, a firm that had led the development of architecture in Jordan for three decades.

Awards and recognition

1998 - Award of Excellence by the late King Hussein of Jordan for the design & supervision of construction of Karameh Dam
1999 - Award of Merit from the Association of Civil Engineers of New Zealand for the Design & Supervision of construction of Wadi Hadada Tunnel in downtown Amman
2001- Architect  Jafar Tukan, Chairman of Consolidated Consultants, was awarded the Palestine Award for Architecture
1982 & 2002- Jafar Tukan  was also awarded two Organization of Arab Cities awards
2003- Best Consultancy Award by the Ministry of Public Works and Housing (MPWH) of Jordan for Dead Sea – Ma'in Project (Roads Specialty)
2004- ACEC Engineering Excellence Award by the American Council of Engineering Companies for the Aqaba Industrial Zone Project
2007- Best Consultancy Award by the Ministry of Public Works and Housing (MPWH) of Jordan for ESIA for DISI Water Conveyance System Project (Specialized Engineering)
2009- Best Executed Project Award by Greater Amman Municipality (GAM)
2011- CKing Abdullah Award for Excellence (Private Sector) 
2011- Consultancy Award by the Ministry of Public Works and Housing  of Jordan for Embassy of the Kingdom of the Netherlands Project (Buildings Specialty)
2011- Best Consultancy Award by the Ministry of Public Works and Housing  of Jordan for Prince Hussein Bin Abdullah II Intersection Project (Roads Specialty)

Notable projects

 Jabal Omar Development Project, Zones S1 & S2, KSA
 Shams Al Riyadh Residential Committee, KSA
 Al Batinah Coastal Highway | Oman
 Bereket- Etrek- Turkmenistan- Iran Board Railway, Turkmenistan
 KINAXX Housing Project -20,000 apartments, Angola
 Ersal Master Plan, Palestine
 Metelong Dam, Lesotho
 Al-Kufra - Jabel Ewinat - Nile River Road, Libya & Sudan
 Jordan Gate Towers, Jordan
 Amman Development Corridor, Jordan
 Abu Dhabi Medium and Small Court Houses, UAE
 Al Gira Development Project (2000 Housing Units), Libya
 Yaser Arafat Memorial Museum, Palestine
 Al Najah National University, Palestine
 Mahmmoud Darwish Memorial Park, Palestine
 Jordan University for Science and Technology, Jordan
 Jordan National Library, Jordan (Best Executed Project Award 2009)
 QIPCO Twin Towers, Qatar
 Hajj Oasis (Pilgrim City), Jordan
 Sewer and Storm Water Master Plan for Kirkuk, Iraq
 Aqaba New Shallaleh Neighborhood (1100 Housing Units),' Jordan (Arab Council of Ministers of Housing and Reconstruction 2007 Award)
 Prince Hussein Bin Abdullah II Intersection, Jordan (Best Consultancy Award 2011 - Road Specialty)
 Karameh Dam, Jordan (Al Hussein Medal for Distinguished Performance of the First Order)
 ESIA for DISI Water Conveyance System Project, Jordan  (Best Consultancy Award 2007 - Specialized Engineering)
 Dead Sea Maain Road, Jordan (Best Consultancy Award 2003 - Road Specialty)
 Aqaba Industrial Zone Project, Jordan (ACEC Engineering Excellence Award)
 Wadi Hadada Tunnel in downtown Amman, Jordan (Award of MERIT)

References

External links
Consolidated Consultants Group

Architecture firms of Jordan
Companies based in Amman
International engineering consulting firms
Engineering companies of Jordan
Consulting firms established in 1960